Gates Corner is an unincorporated community in Delaware County, Indiana, in the United States.

History
Gates Corner once contained a post office, named Gates. It operated from 1898 until 1901.

References

Unincorporated communities in Delaware County, Indiana
Unincorporated communities in Indiana